Joseph Edward Webster (15 June 1902 − 22 August 1945) was a British long-distance runner. He competed in the men's 10,000 metres at the 1924 Summer Olympics. He was killed in a military vehicle accident during World War II.

Personal life
Webster served as a gunner in the Royal Artillery during the Second World War and was killed in a road accident in Italy on 21 August 1945, a month before he was to be demobilized. He is buried at Salerno War Cemetery.

References

External links

1902 births
1945 deaths
Military personnel from Birmingham, West Midlands
Athletes (track and field) at the 1924 Summer Olympics
British male long-distance runners
Olympic athletes of Great Britain
Place of birth missing
Olympic cross country runners
British Army personnel killed in World War II
Royal Artillery soldiers
Road incident deaths in Italy
People from Rowley Regis